This page lists the albums that reached number-one on the overall Top R&B/Hip-Hop Albums chart and the Rap Albums chart in 2012. The Rap Albums chart partly serves as a distillation for rap-specific titles from the overall R&B/Hip-Hop Albums chart.

Chart history

See also
2012 in music
2012 in hip hop music
List of number-one R&B/hip-hop songs of 2012 (U.S.)
List of Billboard 200 number-one albums of 2012

References 

2012
2012
United States RandB Hip Hop Albums